The 1970 FIFA World Cup qualification UEFA Group 6 was a UEFA qualifying group for the 1970 FIFA World Cup. The group comprised Belgium, Finland, Spain and Yugoslavia.

Standings

Matches

External links 
Group 6 Detailed Results at RSSSF

6
1968–69 in Belgian football
1969–70 in Belgian football
1968 in Finnish football
1969 in Finnish football
1968–69 in Spanish football
1969–70 in Spanish football
1968–69 in Yugoslav football
1969–70 in Yugoslav football